Bočkovec  is a village in Croatia.

Populated places in Koprivnica-Križevci County